Geesje Hendrika (Geke) Faber (born 5 August 1952, 's-Graveland) is a Dutch politician who was mayor of Zaanstad from 2007 until 2016. Between 1990 and 1998 she was mayor of Zeewolde, she served as interim mayor in Wageningen between 2002 and 2003 and in Den Helder between 2005 and 2007. In the Second Kok cabinet she served as State Secretary for Agriculture, Nature Management and Fishery.

References

1952 births
Living people
Women mayors of places in the Netherlands
Labour Party (Netherlands) politicians
Mayors in North Holland
People from Den Helder
Mayors of Zaanstad
Mayors of Wageningen
Members of the Provincial Council of Friesland
People from Wijdemeren
People from Zeewolde
State Secretaries for Agriculture of the Netherlands